KAAA (1230 AM) is a radio station broadcasting a News Talk Information format, licensed to Kingman, Arizona, United States. The station is currently owned by Cameron Broadcasting, Inc. and forms a full-time simulcast with KZZZ in Bullhead City. The stations feature programming from Fox News, Premiere Networks, Westwood One and Salem Radio Network among others.

History
KGAN signed on October 7, 1949. It broadcast with 250 watts on 1230 kHz. The station, an ABC affiliate, was sold in early 1956 by original owner J. James Glancy to Wallace Stone and John F. Holbrook for $25,000; the new owners changed the call letters to the present KAAA on February 19, 1956. Stone bought out Holbrook two years later, and in 1963, the station was authorized to increase daytime power to 1,000 watts.
Stone sold KAAA in 1971 for $225,000 to Sun Mountain Broadcasting, the principals of which included an FM station applicant in Lake Havasu City and a station salesman. Under Sun Mountain, a companion FM station, KZZZ 92.7 (now KFLG-FM 94.7), was launched. By the time KAAA-KZZZ was sold to Mohave Sun Broadcasting in 1981, KAAA broadcast a mixed Top 40-country format.

In 2001, KAAA was consolidated with KZZZ at that station's Bullhead City studio base. The former Kingman studio and transmitter building was demolished in 2014 to allow redevelopment of the land. Cameron currently maintains studios in Kingman, Bullhead City and Lake Havasu City.

References
 Sies, Luther F.  Encyclopedia of American Radio 1920–1960. Jefferson, NC:McFarland, 2000.

External links
 cameronbroadcasting.com
 FCC History Cards for KAAA

 
 
 
 

AAA
News and talk radio stations in the United States
Radio stations established in 1949
1949 establishments in Arizona